Matthew Jacobs (born 1 July 1956) is a British writer, director, producer and actor. He is known best for his extensive career writing for television shows like Doctor Who and The Young Indiana Jones Chronicles. He also directed two prize-winning TV movies for BBC films, Hallelujah Anyhow (1992) and Mothertime (1998).  As an actor, he starred alongside Danny Huston in Boxing Day, Bernard Rose's 2012 adaptation of Leo Tolstoy's novella "Master and Man".

Life and career
Jacobs worked as one of the many writers for George Lucas's The Young Indiana Jones Chronicles. His episodes included "Passion for Life," "The Perils of Cupid," "Travels with Father," "Spring Break Adventure," "Attack of the Hawkmen" and "Hollywood Follies."

Jacobs is perhaps best remembered for writing and co-producing the 1996 Doctor Who television movie, which featured Paul McGann as the Doctor and Eric Roberts as the Master. Jacobs was responsible for writing the first televised Doctor Who story to be broadcast as a show in its own right, rather than as part of a charity telethon, since Survival (1989).

Jacobs has also written several screenplays. His film credits include Lassie, The Emperor's New Groove and the cult classic Paperhouse.

Aside from his work in television and film, Jacobs has worked on other projects in the entertainment industry. He wrote for the video games Outlaws and Star Wars: Starfighter.

Jacobs' father, the actor Anthony Jacobs, appeared in the Doctor Who serial The Gunfighters in 1966, and took his son to visit the set one day during production.

Jacobs's father was Jewish; Jacobs practices no religion.

Filmography

Films

Filmmaking credits

Acting credits

Television

Screenwriting credits

Acting credits

Writer for video games 

 Outlaws (1997, dialogue)
 Star Wars: Starfighter (2001)

References

External links
 
 

1956 births
British male screenwriters
British television writers
Place of birth missing (living people)
Living people
British male television writers